The Royal Belgian Ice Hockey Federation (RBIHF) is the Belgian ice hockey federation, known in Dutch as the Koninklijke Belgische IJshockey Federatie (KBIJF) and in French as the Fédération Royale Belge de Hockey sur Glace (FRBHG). It is responsible for administering ice hockey in Belgium, from the national team to the local leagues to youth development.

History
The Royal Belgian Ice Hockey Federation was formed in 1912 by Henry Van den Bulck. He became its first president remained in the position until 1920. It was known as the Belgian Ice Hockey Federation until 1973 when the Royal prefix was added to the name.

List of presidents

Leagues and levels
The following leagues exist in Belgium:
 BENE-League (joined league Belgium - The Netherlands)
 Division 1
 Division 2
 Division 3 (Recreational)
 Under 19
 Under 16
 Under 14
 Under 12
 Under 10
 Under 8

The RBIHF also organizes friendlies.

National teams
Belgium has 5 national ice hockey teams:
 Senior team
 Under 20
 Under 18
 Women's national team

References

External links
Official website

1912 establishments in Belgium
Belgium
Belgian Ice Hockey Federation
International Ice Hockey Federation members
Organisations based in Belgium with royal patronage

Sports organizations established in 1912
Ice hockey